Chahar Qaleh-ye Barani (also Romanized as Chahār Qal‘eh-ye Bārānī) is a village in Kuhdasht-e Jonubi Rural District, in the Central District of Kuhdasht County, Lorestan Province, Iran. At the 2006 census, its population was 43, in 9 families.

References 

Towns and villages in Kuhdasht County